Kenneth Allen Taylor (November 4, 1954 – December 2, 2019) was an American philosopher and co-host (with John Perry) of the radio program Philosophy Talk.

Education and career

Taylor received his A.B. from the University of Notre Dame in 1977. He received his Ph.D. in 1984 from the University of Chicago, where he completed his dissertation under the supervision of Leonard Linsky. Before coming to Stanford, Taylor taught in the philosophy departments at Rutgers University, University of Maryland at College Park, Wesleyan University, University of North Carolina at Chapel Hill, and Middlebury College.

Taylor chaired the department of philosophy at Stanford University from 2001 to 2009.

He died from a heart attack on December 2, 2019.

Philosophical work

Taylor specialized in philosophy of language and philosophy of mind.  Taylor's interests included semantics, reference, naturalism, and relativism. He authored numerous articles, which appeared in journals such as Noûs, Philosophical Studies, and Philosophy and Phenomenological Research. Taylor also published three books: Truth and Meaning: An Introduction to the Philosophy of Language (Blackwell Publishers), Reference and the Rational Mind (CSLI  Publications), and Meaning Diminished: Toward Metaphysically Modest Semantics (Oxford University Press).

Bibliography

See also
American philosophy
List of American philosophers

External links
Interview with What Is It Like to be a Philosopher?

References

African-American writers
University of Notre Dame alumni
African-American philosophers
American philosophers
Philosophers of language
Philosophers of mind
Wesleyan University faculty
Stanford University Department of Philosophy faculty
1954 births
2019 deaths
People from Sandusky, Ohio
University of Chicago alumni
Philosophers from Ohio
20th-century African-American people
21st-century African-American people